Johannes Bronkhorst (born 17 July 1946, Schiedam) is a Dutch Orientalist and Indologist, specializing in Buddhist studies and early Buddhism. He is emeritus professor at the University of Lausanne.

Life
After studying Mathematics, Physics, and Astronomy at the Vrije Universiteit in Amsterdam (B.Sc. 1968), he moved to India, where he turned to Sanskrit and Pāli, first at the University of Rajasthan (Jaipur), then the University of Pune (M.A. 1976, Ph.D. 1979). In Pune he read with traditional Sanskrit scholars, specializing in Sanskrit grammar and Indian philosophy. Back in the Netherlands, he did a second doctorate (1980) at the University of Leiden. Having worked for research projects funded by the Nederlandse Organisatie voor Wetenschappelijk Onderzoek, he was appointed in 1987 to the position of Professor of Sanskrit and Indian studies at the University of Lausanne. He retired in 2011.

Work
Bronkhorst has concentrated on the history of Indian thought and published on a wide range of topics, including indigenous grammar and linguistics, the interaction between Brahmanism, Buddhism, and Jainism and their philosophical schools and religious practices. A key output of this work appeared in his monograph Greater Magadha (2007). The book has been reviewed by several scholars including Jason Neelis and Alexander Wynne. Some of Bronkhort's publications address larger questions relating to the theory and study of religion. The website of the University of Lausanne provides access to some of his work.

Bronkhorst became a corresponding member of the Royal Netherlands Academy of Arts and Sciences in 1996.

Selected publications
How the Brahmins Won From Alexander to the Guptas. Brill. 2016.
Rites without symbols Method & Theory in the Study of Religion. In press.
Buddhism in the Shadow of Brahmanism. Leiden – Boston: Brill. (Handbook of Oriental Studies 2/24.). 2011.
Language and Reality: On an episode in Indian thought. Leiden - Boston: Brill. 2011.
"Archetypes and bottlenecks: Reflections on the text history of the Mahābhārata." Pūrvāparaprajñābhinandanam. East and West, Past and Present. Indological and Other Essays in Honour of Klaus Karttunen. Ed. Bertil Tikkanen & Albion M. Butters. Helsinki: Finnish Oriental Society. 2011. (Studia Orientalia 110, 2011.) pp. 39–54.
"The spread of Sanskrit." From Turfan to Ajanta. Festschrift for Dieter Schlingloff on the Occasion of his Eightieth Birthday. Ed. Eli Franco and Monika Zin. Lumbini International Research Institute. 2010. Vol. 1. pp. 117–139.
"Ritual, holophrastic utterances, and the symbolic mind." Ritual Dynamics and the Science of Ritual. Volume I: Grammar and morphologies of ritual practices in Asia. Ed. Axel Michaels and Anand Mishra. Wiesbaden: Harrassowitz. 2010. pp. 159–202.
"What did Indian philosophers believe?” Logic and Belief in Indian Philosophy. Ed. Piotr Balcerowicz. Delhi: Motilal Banarsidass. 2009 [2010]. (Warsaw Indological Studies, 3.) pp. 19–44.Buddhist Teaching in India. Boston: Wisdom Publications. 2009.
"Udbhaṭa, a grammarian and a Cārvāka.” Linguistic Traditions of Kashmir. Essays in memory of paṇḍit Dinanath Yaksha. Ed. Mrinal Kaul and Ashok Aklujkar. New Delhi: D. K. Printworld. 2008. pp. 281–299.Greater Magadha. Studies in the culture of early India. Leiden – Boston: Brill. 2007. (Handbook of Oriental Studies, Section 2 South Asia, 19.)
"Vedānta as Mīmāṃsā.” Mīmāṃsā and Vedānta: Interaction and Continuity. Ed. Johannes Bronkhorst. Delhi: Motilal Banarsidass. (Papers of the 12th World Sanskrit Conference, 10.3.) 2007. pp. 1–91.Modes of debate and refutation of adversaries in classical and medieval India: a preliminary investigation. Antiqvorvm Philosophia 1 (“Forme di dibattito e di confutazione degli avversari nel pensiero antico”), 2007, 269-280.
“Systematic philosophy between the empires: some determining features.” Between the Empires: Society in India 300 BCE to 400 CE. Ed. Patrick Olivelle. Oxford etc.: Oxford University Press. 2006. pp. 287–313.William James et son darwinisme religieux. Archives de psychologie 72, 2006, 33-48.Bhaṭṭoji Dīkṣita on sphoṭa. Journal of Indian Philosophy 33(1), 2005, 3-41.
“Ājīvika doctrine reconsidered.” Essays in Jaina Philosophy and Religion. Ed. Piotr Balcerowicz. Delhi: Motilal Banarsidass. 2003. (Lala Sundarlal Jain Research Series, 20.) pp. 153–178.Sylvain Lévi et les origines du théâtre indien. Asiatische Studien/Études Asiatiques 57(4), 2003, 793-811.Literacy and rationality in ancient India. Asiatische Studien/Études Asiatiques 56(4), 2002, 797-831.
"Discipliné par le débat." Le disciple et ses maîtres. Pour Charles Malamoud. Under the direction of Lyne Bansat-Boudon and John Scheid. Paris: Éditions du Seuil. 2002. (Le genre humain, 37.) pp. 207–225.Pāṇini and Euclid: reflections on Indian geometry. Journal of Indian Philosophy 29 (1-2; Ingalls Commemoration Volume), 2001, 43-80.
"The perennial philosophy and the law of karma." Aldous Huxley between East and West. Ed. C. C. Barfoot. Amsterdam - New York, N.Y.: Rodopi. 2001. (Studies in Comparative Literature, 37.) pp. 175–189.Etymology and magic: Yāska's Nirukta, Plato's Cratylus, and the riddle of semantic etymologies. Numen 48, 2001, 147-203.
"Abhidharma and Jainism." Abhidharma and Indian Thought. Essays in honor of Professor Doctor Junsho Kato on his sixtieth birthday''. Ed. Committee for the Felicitation of Professor Doctor Junsho Kato's Sixtieth Birthday, Nagoya. Tokyo: Shuju-sha. 2000. pp. 598–581 ([13]-[30]).

References

External links 
 Johannes Bronkhorst at the University of Lausanne

1946 births
Buddhist studies scholars
Dutch historians of philosophy
Dutch Indologists
Dutch Sanskrit scholars
Leiden University alumni
Living people
Members of the Royal Netherlands Academy of Arts and Sciences
Linguists of Pali
People from Schiedam
Academic staff of the University of Lausanne
Vrije Universiteit Amsterdam alumni